Michael Rosensweig (born December 22, 1956) is a Rosh Yeshiva at  the Rabbi Isaac Elchanan Theological Seminary of Yeshiva University and the Rosh Kollel of the Beren Kollel Elyon.

Education
Michael Rosensweig studied with Joseph B. Soloveitchik at Yeshiva University, and with Aharon Lichtenstein at Yeshivat Har Etzion. He received his Semicha from the Rabbi Isaac Elchanan Theological Seminary, and was a distinguished fellow at RIETS's post-semicha Gruss Kollel Elyon. He also studied with Yerucham Bobrofksy, a disciple of Baruch Ber Leibowitz, at Yeshiva High School of Queens.

Rosensweig graduated summa cum laude from Yeshiva College in 1977, and received his M.A. and Ph.D. in Medieval Jewish History from the Bernard Revel Graduate School of Jewish Studies, where he was mentored by Haym Soloveitchik, for whom he wrote both his M.A. thesis and doctoral dissertation ("Debt Collection in Absentia: Halakhah in a Mobile and Commercial Age"). Rosensweig is one of the only doctoral students mentored by Soloveitchik.

Talmudic Methodology
Inspired by his teachers Rabbi Soloveitchik and Rabbi Lichtenstein, Rabbi Rosensweig employs a unique expanded form of the conceptual Brisker methodology in explaining Talmudic topics, with intense focus on the opinions of Rambam. To develop a broader and more nuanced perspective on issues and the topic as a whole, Rabbi Rosensweig meticulously presents the varying approaches of the Rishonim and Acharonim on the sugya, highlighting their underlying conceptual assumptions as well as pointing to consistencies in their views in other areas. He also seeks to accentuate the broader Torah values expressed by Halachic institutions.

Appointment as Rosh Yeshiva and Rosh Kollel
In 1985, Rosensweig was appointed Rosh Yeshiva at RIETS, where he currently holds the Nathan and Perel Schupf Chair of Talmud. In 1997, he was appointed Rosh Kollel of the prestigious Beren Institute for Advanced Talmudic Studies (Beren Kollel Elyon) at RIETS.

In 2013, Rosensweig was invited to become the Rosh HaYeshiva at Yeshivat Kerem B'Yavneh in Israel.

External links
 articles, audio, and video on TorahWeb.org
 Avraham Wein, From the Micro to the Meta: Rabbi Michael Rosensweig's Unique Contribution to Torat Brisk, Yeshiva University 2018.

References

1956 births
Living people
Modern Orthodox rabbis
American Orthodox rabbis
Yeshiva University rosh yeshivas
Rabbi Isaac Elchanan Theological Seminary semikhah recipients
Yeshivat Har Etzion